PT Wismilak Inti Makmur Tbk, commonly known as Wismilak, is an Indonesian holding company of cigarette producer PT Gelora Djaja and cigarette distributor PT Gawih Jaya, and the fourth-largest Indonesian tobacco manufacturer after Gudang Garam.

With tobacco being addictive and the single greatest cause of preventable death globally, the company has had to contend with rising taxes, health warnings and tougher labeling regulations.

History
Wismilak's origin has started by Gelora Djaja when it was established in Surabaya, East Java, on September 12, 1962, by Lie Koen Lie and Oei Bian Koen Hok with just 10 employees. The company has been listed on the Indonesia Stock Exchange since 18 December 2012 under the symbol "WIIM".

In 2022, Wismilak's net profit increased by 30.33 percent again, to IDR82.16 billion. In fact, in the same period in 2021, WIIM's net profit was only IDR 63.04 billion. The growth of Wismilak's net profit occurred in the midst of the collapse of the net profits of the country's largest cigarette issuers.

Health warnings and sales
Following the introduction of graphic health warnings on cigarette packets in Indonesia in 2014, several tobacco companies recorded declines in sales. Wismilak corporate secretary Surjanto Yasaputera had initially expressed hope the company would remain on target to increase sales by 20% to 25% in 2014. Wismilak's sales reportedly fell 15.7%, or Rp.760.7 billion (US$57 million), year-on-year from January to July 2017.

Brands

Hand-rolled clove cigarettes

 Wismilak Special
 Wismilak Dirgha
 Wismilak Satya
 Galan Kretek
 Galan Prima

Hand-rolled clove slim cigarettes
 Wismilak Slim
 Galan Slim

Machine-made full flavor clove cigarettes

 Wismilak Filter
 Wismilak Diplomat
 Galan Filter
 Galan International

Machine-made light mild clove cigarettes

 Galan Mild
 Diplomat Mild
 Diplomat Mild Menthol
 Diplomat Impact
 Diplomat Evo
 Fun Mild

Cigar
 Wismilak Premium Cigar

References

External links
 

1994 establishments in Indonesia
2012 initial public offerings
Companies based in Surabaya
Companies listed on the Indonesia Stock Exchange
Holding companies established in 1994
Indonesian brands
Manufacturing companies established in 1962
Manufacturing companies of Indonesia
Tobacco companies of Indonesia